Too Far Gone is the second studio album by American heavy metal band Cane Hill, released on January 19, 2018 through Rise Records. It is their most successful album (to date), topping Billboard's Heatseekers Chart and charting at #8 on Billboard's Independent Albums Chart.

Reception

In April 2018, Loudwire named Too Far Gone as one of the best metal albums of 2018 (so far), commenting: "Combining nu metal and metalcore for a slick and modern sound with plenty of Korn worship, there’s been a huge amount of buzz surrounding Cane Hill thanks to songs like “Lord of Flies,” “It Follows” and the album’s title track.”

Track listing

Personnel
Cane Hill
 Elijah Witt – lead vocals
 James Barnett – guitars
 Ryan Henriquez – bass
 Devin Clark – drums, percussion
Production
 Drew Fulk – production, recording, mixing, mastering
 Jeff Dunne – engineering, mixing, mastering

Charts

References

2018 albums
Cane Hill (band) albums
Rise Records albums